Oglethorpe Power Corporation is a medium-sized electric utility in Georgia, United States. Formed in 1974, Oglethorpe is a not-for-profit cooperative owned by the 38 electric membership corporations that it serves. The utility's headquarters are in Tucker, Georgia.

History
In 1935, the Rural Electrification Administration (REA) provided loans for building transmission lines in rural areas, and EMCs were created in Georgia to purchase power from various sources. In 1974, 39 Georgia-based EMCs incorporated Oglethorpe Power Corporation to invest in generating capacities and transmission lines.

In 1996, Oglethorpe Power signed a 15-year, $4-5 billion deal with LG&E to receive half of its electricity needs from the Kentucky-based power supplier, with a locked down price on the coal-fired megawatt that LG&E must maintain.

In 1997, Ogelthorpe restructured into three separate, but interrelated, cooperatives. Oglethorpe Power Corporation handles electricity generation, Georgia Transmission Corporation owns and operates the transmission lines and substations and Georgia System Operations Corporation provides system and administrative support.

In September 2008, Oglethorpe Power announced the construction of a massive woody biomass power plant (two 100-megawatt-per-year, carbon-neutral facilities) to power nearly half of Georgia's population.

In 2017, the turmoil surrounding the failed deliveries of nuclear reactors by bankrupted Westinghouse put Oglethorpe Power at the forefront of the country's nuclear crisis.

Activity
Oglethorpe Power is the largest power supply cooperative in the United States based upon assets and annual kilowatt-hour sales. The utility's service area covers 65 percent of the state of Georgia. Ogelthorpe co-owns several of its plants with Georgia Power (largest electricity supplier in the state) and the Municipal Electric Authority of Georgia.

Oglethorpe's power plants has an annual revenue of $1 billion and assets of over $7 billion, and 4.1 million customers (2011). About 24% of the capacity is coal, 47% natural gas, 19% nuclear and 10% hydroelectric power (2009).

Oglethorpe Power owns 817 megawatts of the 1,095-megawatt Rocky Mountain Hydroelectric Plant, a pure pumped-storage hydroelectric plant that stores energy during periods of low electricity demand and produces electricity during periods of high demand. The utility's nuclear power comes from its partial ownership of the Edwin I. Hatch Nuclear Generating Station and the Alvin W. Vogtle Electric Generating Plant. It has partial ownership of two coal plants and full ownership of 3 combined cycle power plants and several gas turbine power plants.

Oglethorpe is a 30% partner in the project to build two new AP1000 nuclear reactors at Vogtle, and has $3 billion of Department of Energy loan guarantees for the project. In 2018 it sought more loan guarantees to cover cost overruns on the project. Lead partner Georgia Power agreed to pay an additional proportion of any project completion costs beyond $9.2 billion.

Governance
There is a Board of Directors that has directors and managers from EMCs (Electric Membership Cooperative) and an independent director. There is also the Leadership, which has a President, a Vice President, Senior Vice Presidents, and Executive Vice Presidents.

Leadership

Board of Directors

References

Energy Information Administration

External links
Oglethorpe Power Corporation

Electric generation and transmission cooperatives in the United States
Companies based in Tucker, Georgia
Energy companies established in 1974
Non-renewable resource companies established in 1974
Energy in Georgia (U.S. state)